Otto Amen (July 22, 1912 – April 24, 2011) was an American politician in the state of Washington. He served in the Washington House of Representatives from 1967 to 1983 for district 9.

References

2011 deaths
1912 births
Republican Party members of the Washington House of Representatives
People from Ritzville, Washington